This list of East Carolina University alumni includes graduates, non-graduate former students and current students of East Carolina University. East Carolina alumni are generally known as Pirates.

The first class of 123 students entered ECTTS in 1909, and the first 16 graduates received their degrees in 1911. Since then, the institute has greatly expanded, with an enrollment of 17,728 undergraduates and 5,436 postgraduate students .

Business

Athletics

Administration

American football

Athletes

American soccer

Baseball

Basketball

Maurice Kemp (born 1991), basketball player in the Israeli Basketball Premier League

Olympics

NASCAR

Humanities

Arts and entertainment

Authors

Emmy Award winners

Politics

Public service

Military service

Pulitzer Prize winners

References

East Carolina University alumni